Malone is a  long stream of the Metropolitan City of Turin in Piedmont, north-western Italy. It is a left side tributary of the river Po which flows through the Canavese.

Geography 
The river's source is at Monte Soglio from which it falls quickly and rapidly through the communes of  Corio, Rocca Canavese, Barbania and Front (TO), growing in force as it receives contributions from streams descending from the Riserva Naturale della Vauda nature reserve on its right bank. The Malone then runs past Rivarossa, Lombardore, San Benigno Canavese then arrives at Brandizzo (near Chivasso) where it enters the Po.

Regime 

The Italian word torrente, translated as torrent, or stream, refers to a river in which the flow is subject to a wide and broadly predictable seasonal variation. Torrents often dry up in summer.

The Malone in full flood, however, can be genuinely “torrential” in the normal English sense of the word. The mean discharge of around  can increase a hundredfold and cause great damage, as happened in the flood of October 2000.

References

Other projects

Rivers of the Province of Turin
Canavese
Rivers of Italy
Rivers of the Alps
Brandizzo